Anis Ghorbel (born 24 April 1989) is a Tunisian tennis player.

Ghorbel has a career high ATP singles ranking of 479 achieved on 19 September 2016. He also has a career high ATP doubles ranking of 264, achieved on 23 July 2018. Ghorbel has won 1 ITF singles title and 26 ITF doubles titles. 
 
Ghorbel has represented Tunisia at Davis Cup, where he has a win–loss record of 5–7.

Future and Challenger finals

Singles: 6 (1–5)

Doubles 60 (31–29)

External links 
 
 
 

1989 births
Living people
Tunisian male tennis players
People from Sfax
Mediterranean Games silver medalists for Tunisia
Mediterranean Games medalists in tennis
Competitors at the 2018 Mediterranean Games
21st-century Tunisian people